The 1939 All-Southern Conference football team consists of American football players chosen by the Associated Press (AP) and United Press (UP) for the All-Southern Conference football team for the 1939 college football season.

All-Southern Conference selections

Backs
 Snuffy Stirnweiss, North Carolina (AP-1)
 George McAfee, Duke (AP-1)
 Banks McFadden, Clemson (AP-1) (College Football Hall of Fame)
 Rhoten Shetley, Furman (AP-1)

Ends
 Joe Blalock, Clemson (AP-1)
 Paul Severin, North Carolina (AP-1)

Tackles
 Ruppert Pate, Wake Forest (AP-1)
 Dick Boisseau, Washington & Lee (AP-1)

Guards
 Frank Ribar, Duke (AP-1)
 Allen Johnson, Duke (AP-1)

Centers
 Ed Merrick, Richmond (AP-1)

Key
AP = Associated Press

UP = United Press

See also
1939 College Football All-America Team

References

All-Southern Conference football team
All-Southern Conference football teams